Kissing Point ferry wharf is located on the northern side of the Parramatta River serving the Sydney suburb of Putney. It is served by Sydney Ferries Parramatta River services operating between Circular Quay and Parramatta. The single wharf is served by RiverCat class ferries.

Wharves & services

References

External links

 Kissing Point Wharf at Transport for New South Wales (Archived 12 June 2019)

Ferry wharves in Sydney